Chengzhai is a township of Xingtang County in western Hebei province, China, located in the eastern foothills of the Taihang Mountains about  northwest of the county seat. , it has 25 villages under its administration.

See also
List of township-level divisions of Hebei

References

Township-level divisions of Hebei